Haider Ali, or similar spellings, may refer to:

 Haidar Ali (actor), (born 1948) Indian actor
 Haider Ali (boxer) (born 1979), Pakistani Olympic boxer
 Haider Alo Ali (born 1979), Emirati footballer
 Haider Ali (athlete) (born 1984), all-round Pakistani Paralympic athlete
 Haider Ali (cricketer) (born 2000), Pakistani cricketer
 Haider Ali (cricketer, born 1994), Pakistani cricketer
 Haider Ali (cricketer, born 1997), Pakistani cricketer
 Haider Ali (cricketer, born 2000), Pakistani cricketer
 Haider Ali (artist), Pakistani painter
 Hyder Ali (c. 1722–1782), de facto ruler of the Kingdom of Mysore in southern India
 Hyder Ali (Indian cricketer) (1943–2022), former Indian cricketer
 Haider Ali Kohari, (c. 1710—1770), military general in India

See also
 Ali Haidar (disambiguation)